The Jamaica national under-20 football team is the national under-20 football team representing Jamaica and is controlled by the Jamaica Football Federation. The team qualified for the FIFA U-20 World Cup in 2001, and was second placed in the Pan American Games in 2007. It has also taken part in the CONCACAF Under-20 Championship and the CFU U-20 Tournament.

Qualification history 

1999:
2001: Qualified for 2001 FIFA World Youth Championship
2003: Eliminated in CFU qualifying
2005: Eliminated 4th in Group B in CONCACAF Final round
2007: Eliminated 4th in Group 1 in CONCACAF Final round
2009: Eliminated 3rd in Group B in CONCACAF Final round
2011: Eliminated 3rd in Group A in CONCACAF Final round
2013: Eliminated in quarterfinals in CONCACAF Final round
2015: Eliminated 4th in Group A in CONCACAF Final round
2017: Eliminated in CFU First round
2018: Eliminated 2nd in Group B in CONCACAF Final round
2020: Cancelled due to COVID 19
2022: Eliminated in quarterfinals in CONCACAF Final round

Honors
Pan American Games:
Runner-up (1): 2007

Upcoming Schedule

Players

Current squad 
 The following players were called up for the 2022 CONCACAF U-20 Championship.
 Match dates: 18 June – 3 July 2022
 Caps and goals correct as of:' 26 June 2022, after match against 
 Names in italics denote players who have been capped for the senior team.''

Technical staff
 Head Coach:  Marcell Gayle 
 Asst. Coach: Leecoft Lettman 
 Goalkeeper Coach: Andrew Sewell

Previous Results 
The following is a list of matches played in the last 3 U-20 cycles as well as any games scheduled to take place in the future.

Previous U20 Players and staff

2018 CONCACAF Final Round squad 

Squad named for final round.

Stats as of November 4, 2018 following match versus Nicaragua u20s.

2016 player pool 
These are the players called in training camp for the 2016 CFU First round, caps updated on January 1, 2016.

2015 CONCACAF U20 final squad 
This is the list for the 2015 CONCACAF U20 Championships, caps updated on January 11, 2014.

2015 player pool

Former coaches 
 1999 Clovis DeOlivera 
 2001 Clovis DeOlivera 
 2003 Wendell Downswell 
 2005 Wendell Downswell 
 2007 Dr Dean Weatherly 
 2009 Donovan Duckie 
 2011 Walter Gama 
 2013 Wendell Downswell 
 2015 Theodore Whitmore 
 2020-2022 Jerome Waite 
 2022-Marcell Gayle

Notable former players 
 Ryan Thompson
 Rudolph Austin
 Ricky Sappleton
 Ricardo Fuller
 Shavar Thomas
 Khari Stephenson
 Dane Richards
 Dever Orgill
 Dwayne Miller
 O'Brian White
 Luton Shelton
 Omar Daley
 Ricky Sappleton
 Kieron Bernard
 Akeem Priestley
 Onandi Lowe
 Jermaine Taylor

References

Under-20
Caribbean national under-20 association football teams